Francesco Pigliaru (born May 13, 1954 in Sassari) is an Italian economist, politician, and professor. He was prorector of the University of Cagliari from 2009 to 2014. He became President of the Autonomous Region of Sardinia on March 12, 2014 following the regional election of February 16, 2014.

References

1954 births
Living people
Democratic Party (Italy) politicians
Presidents of Sardinia
People from Sassari
Members of the Regional Council of Sardinia
Academic staff of the University of Cagliari